Mimopacha knoblauchii is a species of Lasiocampidae moth.

Distribution
This species is known from Angola, Congo, Cameroon, Equatorial Guinea and South Africa.

References
Dewitz, 1881. Afrikanische Nachtschmetterlinge. Nova acta Leopoldina Bd. 42, no. 2

External links
Images & Distribution map at africanmoths.com

Lasiocampidae
Moths of Africa
Moths described in 1881